Lawrence Ingalls Buell (born 1939) is Powell M. Cabot Professor of American Literature Emeritus at Harvard University, specialist on antebellum American literature and a pioneer of Ecocriticism. He is the 2007 recipient of the Jay Hubbell Medal for Lifetime Achievement in American Literary studies, the "highest professional award that the American Literature Section of the MLA can give."  He won the 2003 Warren-Brooks Award for outstanding literary criticism for his 2003 book on Ralph Waldo Emerson. His Writing for an Endangered World won the 2001 John G. Cawelti Award for the best book in the field of American Culture Studies. He retired from Harvard in 2011.

Life and work
Professor Buell earned an A.B. at Princeton University in 1961 before enrolling at Cornell University for his Ph.D., which he was awarded in 1966.  He was assistant professor and then professor at Oberlin College from 1966 until he moved to Harvard in 1990. He was a Guggenheim Foundation fellow, 1987-1988.

Buell served as the Harvard College Dean of Undergraduate Education from 1992–1996, and later chaired the Department of English and American Literature and Languages.   He also served on the graduate committee for degrees in the study of American Civilization.

Both the Boston Globe and the Harvard Crimson have regularly requested commentary from Buell for published articles concerning his views on undergraduate life.  His term as Dean of Undergraduate Education and previous affiliation with Oberlin College are two important influences on his outlook on undergraduate education, as he is more focused on undergraduate concerns than many of his colleagues at large, research-based universities. His tenure as Dean of Undergraduate Education was unusual in setting the precedent of weekly, walk-in office hours open to all students.

Harvard College Professorship
Buell was part of the first class of Harvard College Professorships in 1998, a now-annual award "created to recognize those especially dedicated to undergraduate teaching" at Harvard University. The award comes with "support to aid the recipient's professional development in the form of a semester of paid leave, or commensurate summer pay, or an equivalent fund to support their scholarly work."  Said Buell, "To be recognized publicly for what one considers inherently most important in one's professional life is by no means to be taken for granted, and I am very grateful...Never during my eight years at Harvard have I taught an undergraduate course that I didn't enjoy teaching."

Little Lulu goes to Harvard
Buell's mother, Marjorie Henderson Buell, was the creator of the Little Lulu cartoon series, begun in the 1930s. In July 2006, Buell and his brother Fred donated the “Marge Papers,” to the Schlesinger Library at Harvard. The papers include a collection of fan letters, comic books, scrapbooks of high points in Lulu’s history, and a complete set of the newspaper cartoons.

The then-President of Harvard University and then-Dean of the Radcliffe Institute for Advanced Study Drew Gilpin Faust suggested the donation after discovering that “Marge” was Buell’s mother. Said Faust, “I was a big Little Lulu fan when I was a kid...[the donation] was a really exciting possibility. His mother was clearly a pathbreaker, both in her creativity in designing the cartoon, the artistry involved, and the proto-feminism in this tough little girl.”

Buell's brother Fred is a published poet and literary critic, and is a professor at Queens College, New York.

Research interests
Buell's research interests include the following: Rethinking U. S. Literature in a Globalizing World, Discourses of Literature and Environment, Theory of National Fiction, Transmutations of Genre in Anglophone Writing, Literature and/of Friendship.

Transcendentalism

Emerson
Buell's 2003 book, Emerson, was published on the eve of Ralph Waldo Emerson's 200th birthday. The book won critical acclaim, picking up the 2003 Warren-Brooks Award soon after publication.

According to the jury, Buell was selected "for a book worthy of both the great philosopher he chose as his topic and of the Brooks and Warren tradition of excellence in literary criticism." The jury added: "In an elegant, clear-speaking style, notably free of pretentious academic jargon, Dr. Buell cogently assesses Emerson's radically original contributions to fields of thought as disparate as science, politics, religion, philosophy, literature and social action."

"I am honored that my 'Emerson' has been chosen as this year's recipient of the Warren-Brooks Award," Buell said. "I also confess to being somewhat bemused and surprised," he added, "that a book about a New England icon toward whom both Mr. Warren and Mr. Brooks felt distinctly ambivalent would be honored in their name, especially considering that only one of its seven chapters is exclusively devoted to Emerson's accomplishment as a creative writer. So for that particular book to be awarded this prize in particular seems deliciously ironic." Buell added, "On the other hand, Emerson always aspired to be a poet first and foremost, and it's no less true that Brooks and Warren were my own first and foremost instructors in the art of reading literary texts. I take the judge's verdict as heartening evidence that Emerson did not aspire in vain, and that my early training somehow managed to stick."

Ecocriticism
He is widely considered a pioneer of Ecocriticism, although his 2005 book The Future of Environmental Criticism uses "Environmental Criticism" in lieu of ecocriticism in both the title and preface to the book, claiming his usage as a "strategic ambiguity" which distances his work from a "cartoon image" of the field "no longer applicable today, if indeed it ever really was."

Bibliography
Literary Transcendentalism (1973)
New England Literary Culture (1986)
The Environmental Imagination: Thoreau, Nature Writing, and the Formation of American Culture, Harvard University Press (1995)
Writing for an Endangered World: Literature, Culture, and Environment in the United States and Beyond, Harvard University Press (2001)
Emerson, Harvard University Press (2003)
The Future of Environmental Criticism: Environmental Crisis and Literary Imagination (2005)
The American Transcendentalists (2006) Editor
Shades of the Planet: American Literature as World Literature (2007) Editor with Wai Chee Dimock
The Dream of the Great American Novel, Harvard University Press (2014)

External links
The Environmental Imagination at Harvard University Press
Writing for an Endangered World at Harvard University Press
Emerson at Harvard University Press
'2007 Hubbell Award Citation and Acceptance Speech

References

1939 births
Living people
Princeton University alumni
American literary critics
Cornell University alumni
Harvard University faculty
Oberlin College faculty